Urwerk is the first compilation album of the German folk metal band Finsterforst, consisting of the re-release of their first two studio albums.

Track listing

Disc one
The first disc contains all the tracks from their "Wiege der Finsternis" EP plus the bonus track "Försterhochzeit".

Disc two
The second disc contains all the tracks from their debut album, "Weltenkraft".

Personnel

Band members
Marco Schomas: Vocals, choir vocals, twelve-string guitar
Tobias Weinreich: Bass
Johannes Joseph: Accordion, choir vocals
Simon Schillinger: Lead and rhythm guitar, acoustic guitar, choir vocals
Cornelius "Wombo" Heck: Drums, choir vocals
Sebastian "AlleyJazz" Scherrer: Keyboards
David Schuldis: Rhythm guitars

Guest musicians
Nefti: Tin whistle
Christoph Schuster: Oboe
Sevan Kirder: Tin whistle, German flute, choir vocals
Jonas Mayer: choir vocals

References

Encyclopaedia Metallum
Metal Storm

2010 albums
Finsterforst albums